Margarita Fullana Riera (born 9 April 1972), also known as Marga Fullana, is a Spanish mountain biker. She won the Bronze Medal in Women's Cross-Country Mountain Biking at the 2000 Summer Olympics.

In 2001 she received the Ramon Llull Award from the government of the Balearic Islands.

References

External links 
 

1972 births
Living people
Cyclists at the 2000 Summer Olympics
Cyclists at the 2004 Summer Olympics
Cyclists at the 2008 Summer Olympics
Olympic cyclists of Spain
Olympic bronze medalists for Spain
Spanish female cyclists
Olympic medalists in cycling
Sportspeople from Mallorca
UCI Mountain Bike World Champions (women)
Medalists at the 2000 Summer Olympics
Cyclists from the Balearic Islands